Naval District Washington is one of eleven current naval regions responsible to Commander, Navy Installations Command for the operation and management of Naval shore installations in the Washington D.C. Metropolitan Area. The Commandant is currently the only remaining Naval Districts from the 1900s era, making it, by default the oldest of the current naval regions. The Commandant is headquartered at the Washington Navy Yard only a few yards away from the Commander, Navy Installations Command headquarters.

History 
As part of the formation of most of the Naval Districts in 1903, Naval District Washington was stood up under the command of the Commandant, Washington Navy Yard. Originally named the Potomac River Naval Command, it was formed from the areas of the Potomac River up to the Great Falls, the District of Columbia, and the Counties of Prince Georges, Montgomery, St. Mary's, Calvert, and Charles in Maryland; Arlington, Fairfax, Stafford, King George, Prince William, and Westmoreland Counties in Virginia, less the Marine Barracks, Quantico, Virginia and the Marine Barracks, Washington, D.C.

Subordinate Commands

As Echelon III Commander 
NDW reports to Commander Naval Installations Command as an Echelon III commander over the following installations:
 Naval Support Activity Washington
 Washington Navy Yard
 Naval Support Facility Naval Research Laboratory
 Naval Support Facility Suitland, supporting the Office of Naval Intelligence
 Naval Support Facility Naval Observatory
 Naval Support Facility Arlington
 Naval Support Facility Carderock, supporting the Carderock Division of the Naval Surface Warfare Center
 Naval Support Activity South Potomac
 Naval Support Facility Indian Head supporting Joint Interoperability Test Command, among others
 Naval Support Facility Dahlgren supporting Naval Surface Warfare Center Dahlgren Division
 Naval Air Station Patuxent River
 Naval Support Activity Annapolis
 United States Naval Academy
 Naval Research Laboratory, Chesapeake Beach Detachment
 Naval Reserve Center Baltimore
 Naval Support Facility Thurmont, commonly known as Camp David
 Naval Support Activity Bethesda, which hosts the Walter Reed National Military Medical Center

As Echelon II Commander 
NDW maintains a direct reporting role to the Chief of Naval Operations as an Echelon II commander in its role as the immediate superior in command (ISIC) for the U.S. Navy Ceremonial Guard at Joint Base Anacostia–Bolling, Human Resources Office Washington and Navy Exchange Bethesda.

See also
 United States Army Military District of Washington
 Air Force District of Washington
 Joint Force Headquarters National Capital Region

External links

References 

Regions and districts of the United States Navy
Buildings and structures in Washington, D.C.
1903 establishments in Washington, D.C.